The 1988 Rhode Island gubernatorial election was held on November 8, 1988. Incumbent Republican Edward D. DiPrete defeated Democratic nominee Bruce Sundlun with 50.83% of the vote.

Primary elections
Primary elections were held on September 14, 1988.

Democratic primary

Candidates
Bruce Sundlun, businessman
Peter Van Daam

Results

General election

Candidates
Edward D. DiPrete, Republican 
Bruce Sundlun, Democratic

Results

References

1988
Rhode Island
Gubernatorial